Revolve, Danger Danger's seventh studio album, marks the return of lead vocalist Ted Poley. It is also the first Danger Danger studio album to feature Rob Marcello on guitar.

Track listing

CD
All titles by Bruno Ravel and Steve West.

 "That's What I'm Talking About" 4:28
 Ted Poley - lead vocals
 Rob Marcello - lead and rhythm guitars
 Bruno Ravel - bass, backing vocals, rhythm guitar
 Steve West - drums, percussion
 Frank Vestry - backing vocals
 "Ghost of Love" 4:58
 Ted Poley - lead vocals
 Rob Marcello - lead and rhythm guitars
 Bruno Ravel - bass, synthesizer, piano
 Steve West - drums, percussion
 Tony Harnell - backing vocals
 "Killin' Love" 5:27
 Ted Poley - lead vocals
 Rob Marcello - lead and rhythm guitars
 Bruno Ravel - bass, backing vocals, clean guitar, synthesizer, piano
 Steve West - drums, percussion
 Luke Ravel - laughter
 "Hearts on the Highway" 4:20
 Ted Poley - lead vocals
 Rob Marcello - lead guitar
 Bruno Ravel - bass, backing vocals, rhythm guitar, synthesizer, piano, strings
 Steve West - drums, percussion
 Frank Vestry - backing vocals
 "Fugitive" 4:03
 Ted Poley - lead vocals
 Bruno Ravel - bass, piano
 Steve West - drums, percussion
 Andy Leftwich - mandolin, mandola
 Mitch Malloy - acoustic guitar, backing vocals
 "Keep on Keepin' On" 4:56
 Ted Poley - lead vocals
 Rob Marcello - lead guitar
 Bruno Ravel - bass, backing vocals, rhythm guitar, B-4 Hammond organ
 Steve West - drums, percussion
 Frank Vestry - backing vocals
 "Rocket To Your Heart" 4:39
 Ted Poley - lead vocals
 Bruno Ravel - bass, strings
 Steve West - drums, percussion
 Paul Laine - synthesizers
 "F.U.$" 4:54
 Ted Poley - lead vocals
 Rob Marcello - guitar solo
 Bruno Ravel - bass, backing vocals, rhythm and acoustic guitars, strings, synthesizers
 Steve West - drums, percussion
 Frank Vestry - backing vocals
 "Beautiful Regret" 4:41
 Ted Poley - lead vocals
 Rob Marcello - lead guitar
 Bruno Ravel - bass, backing vocals, rhythm guitar, synthesizer, piano
 Steve West - drums, percussion
 "Never Give Up" 4:46
 Ted Poley - lead vocals
 Rob Marcello - guitar solo
 Bruno Ravel - rhythm and acoustic guitar, backing vocals, synthesizer
 Steve West - drums, percussion
 "Dirty Mind" 3:50
 Ted Poley - lead vocals
 Rob Marcello - lead and rhythm guitars
 Bruno Ravel - bass, backing vocals, rhythm guitar, piano
 Steve West - drums, percussion
 Jaret Reddick - backing vocals
Total Time: 48:22

Limited Collector's Edition Vinyl
 "That's What I'm Talking About" 4:28
 "Hearts on the Highway" 4:20
 "Rocket To Your Heart" 4:39
 "Dirty Mind" 3:50
 "Fugitive" 4:03
 "Beautiful Regret" 4:41
 "Ghost of Love" 4:58
 "Killin' Love" 5:27
 "F.U.$" 4:54
 "Keep on Keepin' On" 4:56
 "Never Give Up" 4:46

All songs written and composed by Bruno Ravel and Steve West.

Personnel

Band
Ted Poley – lead vocals
Rob Marcello - lead and rhythm guitars
Bruno Ravel – bass, backing vocals, rhythm and acoustic guitars, synthesizer, piano
Steve West – drums, percussion

Additional personnel
Jaret Reddick - backing vocals
Tony Harnell- backing vocals

References

2009 albums
Danger Danger albums